Lise Sarfati (born 1958) is a French photographer and artist. She is noted for her photographs of elusive characters, often young, who resist any attempt to being pinned down. Her work particularly explores the instability of feminine identity. Most recently, Sarfati’s photographs have focused on the relationship between individuals and the urban landscape. She has extensively worked in Russia and the United States.

Life and work
Born in Oran, Algeria (French), Sarfati graduated with an MA. in Russian Studies from the Sorbonne in 1979. In 1986, she became the official photographer for the Académie des Beaux Arts. From 1989 to 1998, she lived in Russia, capturing the atmosphere of a country in transition. Her images of urban ruins and young people in their interior spaces resulted in her first major body of work, Acta Est (2000) published by Phaidon. The series’ poetic approach set itself apart from the categories of travelogue and photo-journalistic essay, conjuring a richly layered world at the edge of reality and fiction

In 2003, she travelled across the United States photographing adolescents in cities such as Austin (TX) Asheville (NC), Portland (OR), New Orleans (LO), Berkeley, Oakland and Los Angeles (CA). The title of this series La Vie Nouvelle (2005) is inspired by La vita nova of Dante Alighieri. The book is published by Twin Palms Publishers. Her subsequent American projects Austin, Texas (2008), On Hollywood (2010) and She (2012) further explore her interests on psychogeography, feminine identity, and the everyday.

With Oh Man (2017), a series of richly detailed tableaux depicting lonesome men walking in downtown Los Angeles, Sarfati departed from her accustomed 35mm format, opting for a 4x5 view camera. This slower image-making process enabled her to enlarge the space for contemplation and invite the viewer to explore what is hidden in these deceptively simple images. One of her photographs from this series was selected as the official visual of Paris Photo 2017.

Critic Sean O'Hagan, writing in The Guardian, said, “Sarfati's photographs, though deceptively simple on first viewing, have a mysterious quality that is to do, in part, with her deft merging of portraiture, snapshot and arranged tableau”.

Sarfati has been awarded the Prix Niepce (1996) and ICP Infinity Award (1996). Between 1996 and 2011, Sarfati was a member of Magnum Photos.

Sarfati is currently represented by Rose Gallery in Los Angeles.

Influence
Cinematographer Sam Levy has cited Sarfati’s work as inspiration for the look of Greta Gerwig’s Oscar-nominated film Lady Bird (2017)

Exhibitions 

 Galerie Particulière (Paris Photo), Paris, France, 2017.
 Centro Italiano per la Fotografia, Torino, Italy, 2016.
 Los Angeles County Museum of Art LACMA, Los Angeles, USA, 2014.
 Yossi Milo Gallery, New York, USA, 2012.
 Brancolini Grimaldi Gallery London, UK, 2012.
 Rose Gallery, Santa Monica, CA, USA, 2012.
 Fotografins Hus, Stockholm, Sweden, 2009.
 La Maison Rouge, Paris, France, 2008.
 Center of Contemporary Art Vinzavod, Moscow, Russia, 2008.
 FOAM Fotografiemuseum, Amsterdam, The Netherlands, 2007.
 Aberdeen Art Gallery, Aberdeen, Scotland, 2007.
 Rencontres Internationales de la Photographie, Arles, France, 2006. 
 Nicolaj Center of Contemporary Art, Copenhagen, Denmark, 2006.
 Museo de San Telmo, San Sebastian, Spain, 2005.
 The Photographer’s Gallery, London, UK, 2005.
 Domus Artium Centro del Arte, Salamanca, Spain, 2004.
 Maison Européenne de la Photographie, Paris, France, 2002.
 Centre National de la Photographie, Paris, France, 1996.

Monographs

 Oh Man. Germany, Steidl, 2017. . Essay by David Campany
 She. Santa Fe, Twin Palms, 2012. .
 Fashion Magazine: Lise Sarfati: Austin, Texas. New York, Magnum, 2008. . Essay by Quentin Bajac.
 The New Life. Santa Fe, Twin Palms, 2005. .
 Acta Est. Phaidon, 2007. . Essay by Olga Medvedkova.

Collections

 Centre Pompidou, Paris, France
 LACMA, Los Angeles County Museum of Art, CA, USA
 SFMOMA, San Francisco Museum of Modern Art, CA, USA
 Brooklyn Museum, NY, USA
 De Young Museum, San Francisco, CA, USA
 Pier 24, San Francisco, CA, USA
 Bard Hessel Museum of Art, Bard College, Annandale-on-Hudson, NY, USA 
 Santa Barbara Museum of Art, CA, USA
 Bruce and Nancy Berman Collection, Los Angeles, CA, USA
 Harry Ransom Center, University of Texas at Austin, TX, USA
 Philadelphia Museum of Art, USA
 Nelson-Atkins Museum of Art, MO, USA
 Maison Européenne de la Photographie, Paris, France
 Bibliothèque Nationale de France, Paris, France
 Fonds National d’Art Contemporain, Paris, France
 Musée Nicéphore Niépce, Chalon-sur-Saône, France 
 Fondation Neuflize Vie, Paris, France
 Domus Artium, Salamanca, Spain
 Fondation Enrique Ordóñez, Spain 
 Wilson Centre for Photography, London, UK
 Sir Elton John’s Collection, UK

References

External links
 Official Website
 Rose Gallery 
Sarfati interview with Paris Photo (2017)
 Sarfati interview with Sean O’Hagan (2012)

French photographers
1958 births
Living people
French women photographers
Magnum photographers
People from Nice
People from Oran
Portrait photographers
Pieds-Noirs
Women photojournalists